Burjan (Serbian Cyrillic: Бурјан) is a settlement in the municipality of Požarevac, Serbia. According to the 2002 census, Burjan has a population of 10,000 people.

References

Populated places in Braničevo District